Bernard Stanley Bachrach (born 1939) is an American historian. He taught history at the University of Minnesota from 1967 until his retirement in 2020. He specializes in the Early Middle Ages, mainly on the topics of medieval warfare, medieval Jewry, and early Angevin history (he has written a biography of Fulk Nerra).

Bachrach received the CEE Distinguished Teaching Award from the University of Minnesota in 1993 and entered the College of Liberal Arts Scholars of the College at Minnesota in 2000. He has also been the recipient of a McKnight Research Award.

Works 

Merovingian Military Organization, 481-751, University of Minnesota Press, 1972. 
Early Carolingian Warfare: Prelude to Empire, University of Pennsylvania Press, 2001. 
The Anatomy of a Little War, a diplomatic and military history of the Gundovald affair (568-586), Westview Press, 1994. 
A History of the Alans in the West: From Their First Appearance in the Sources of Classical Antiquity Through the Early Middle Ages, University of Minnesota Press, 1973. 
Armies and Politics in the Early Medieval West, Variorum, 1993. 
Fulk Nerra,the Neo-Roman Consul 987-1040: A Political Biography of the Angevin Count, University of California Press, 1993. 
 
Warfare and Military Organization in Pre-Crusade Europe, Ashgate Publishing, 2002. 
The Medieval Church: Success or Failure?, Holt, Rinehart & Winston, 1971. 
Early Medieval Jewish Policy in Western Europe, University of Minnesota Press, 1977. 
Jews in Barbarian Europe, Coronado Press, 1977.

References

External links 
Profile at the University of Minnesota website

American medievalists
1939 births
Living people
University of Minnesota faculty
Place of birth missing (living people)
Date of birth missing (living people)
Fellows of the Medieval Academy of America